

576001–576100 

|-bgcolor=#f2f2f2
| colspan=4 align=center | 
|}

576101–576200 

|-bgcolor=#f2f2f2
| colspan=4 align=center | 
|}

576201–576300 

|-bgcolor=#f2f2f2
| colspan=4 align=center | 
|}

576301–576400 

|-id=373
| 576373 Wolfgangbusch ||  || Wolfgang Busch (born 1927), a German astronomical optician, who restores historical telescopes. While working as a high school teacher in the 1970s, he developed the "HAB", an oil-spaced triplet-lens apochromat DIY-kit for amateur astronomers (Src). The asteroid's name was proposed by Carolin Liefke. || 
|}

576401–576500 

|-bgcolor=#f2f2f2
| colspan=4 align=center | 
|}

576501–576600 

|-bgcolor=#f2f2f2
| colspan=4 align=center | 
|}

576601–576700 

|-bgcolor=#f2f2f2
| colspan=4 align=center | 
|}

576701–576800 

|-bgcolor=#f2f2f2
| colspan=4 align=center | 
|}

576801–576900 

|-id=853
| 576853 Rafalreszelewski ||  ||  (born 1996) is a Polish observer of small Solar System bodies, and a discoverer of minor planets and several Kreutz sungrazers comets. He is a member of the "Teide Observatory Tenerife Asteroid Survey" (TOTAS) and proposed the name for asteroid  (Src). || 
|}

576901–577000 

|-bgcolor=#f2f2f2
| colspan=4 align=center | 
|}

References 

576001-577000